In Colorado, State Highway 287 may refer to:
U.S. Route 287 in Colorado, the only Colorado highway numbered 287 since 1968
Colorado State Highway 287 (1938-1953) west of Denver